Uyarthiru 420 is a 2011 Tamil language action drama film directed by S. Premnath The film stars lyricist Snehan,  Vaseegaran, and Meghana Raj in the lead roles, while Akshara Gowda, Aishwarya Rajesh, and Akshaya play supporting roles. The film revolves around "an ordinary man who aspires to become rich by adopting wrong ways like hugging women by taking advantage of them and fondling their hip folds under the pretext of seeing them as sisters". It was released on 12 August 2011. The music was composed by Mani Sharma with cinematography by D. Shankar. The film was shot in Bangalore. The film released on 12 August 2011.

Cast

 Snehan as Thamizh
  Vaseegaran as Rishivanth
 Meghana Raj as Iyal
 Akshara Gowda as Devatha
 Aishwarya as Charu
 Akshaya as Savithri
 Jayaprakash as Jagan Pattabiraman
 R. Chandrasekar as Chandrasekar
 Deepak Dinkar as Thamizh's friend
 Mime Gopi as a rowdy
 Bosskey
 Ramesh Khanna as Muthappan
 Chaams
 Raj Kapoor
 Arjunan as Doctor
 Chitti Babu (special appearance in "Natchathira Hotel")

Soundtrack
The music was composed by Mani Sharma.

Critical reception
Behindwoods wrote:"Not ingenious enough". The New Indian Express wrote that "‘Uyarthiru…’ is an intriguing rogue. Incomprehensible at times, unconvincing at others, but a tolerable, fairly lovable rogue". Nowrunning wrote:"This tale of deception cons you into believing".

References

2011 films
2010s Tamil-language films
Films scored by Mani Sharma
2011 romantic comedy-drama films
Indian romantic comedy-drama films
2011 drama films